Shimla Hill (or Shimla Pahari in the local dialect) is a hill of the Sherwan range extending to the west of Abbottabad, Pakistan. Its name is derived from the Hindko (Punjabi) word Shamla or Shumla, that is, the crest of a turban, since the Sherwan range at this point comes up to Abbottabad in the shape of a crest, or ridge.

References

Hills of Pakistan
Abbottabad District

Landforms of Khyber Pakhtunkhwa